Fusinus zebrinus is a species of sea snail. It is a marine gastropod mollusc in the family Fasciolariidae (spindle snails, tulip snails and their allies ).

Description

Distribution

References

zebrinus
Gastropods described in 1923